Valmieras apriņķis was a historic county of Latvia. Its capital was Valmiera (Wolmar).

History 
The county of Valmiera was created during the administrative territorial reform of the Governorate of Riga in 1783 by merging of parishes from the preexisting Kreis Riga and Kreis Pernau.

After the establishment of the Republic of Latvia in 1918, the Valmieras apriņķis existed until 1949, when the Council of Ministers of the Latvian SSR split it into the newly created districts (rajons) of Valmiera and Rūjiena (dissolved in 1959).

Demographics
At the time of the Russian Empire Census of 1897, Kreis Wolmar had a population of 112,836. Of these, 93.3% spoke Latvian, 3.2% Estonian, 2.0% German, 0.8% Russian, 0.5% Yiddish, 0.1% Romani and 0.1% Polish as their native language.

References

 
Uezds of the Governorate of Livonia